Bandivan (also Romanized as Bandīvān; also known as Mandīvān) is a village in Salami Rural District, Salami District, Khaf County, Razavi Khorasan Province, Iran. At the 2006 census, its population was 955, in 190 families.

See also 

 List of cities, towns and villages in Razavi Khorasan Province

References 

Populated places in Khaf County